The 1966 Michigan Wolverines football team represented the University of Michigan in the 1966 Big Ten Conference football season.  In its eighth year under head coach Bump Elliott, Michigan compiled a 6–4 record (4–3 against conference opponents), tied for third place in the Big Ten, and outscored opponents by a combined total of 236 to 138.

After opening the season with non-conference victories over Oregon State and California, Michigan lost three consecutive games, including losses to No. 1 Michigan State and No. 9 Purdue. The team then won four of its final five games, including a 17–3 victory over rival Ohio State.

Right end Jack Clancy was the team captain and the recipient of the team's most valuable player award. He set a school record and led the Big Ten with 1,077 receiving yards and received both All-American and All-Big Ten honors.

The team's other statistical leaders included quarterback Dick Vidmer with 1,609 passing yards, Dave Fisher with 672 rushing yards, and Jim Detwiler with 60 points scored. Detwiler's 60 points led the Big Ten, and Vidmer's passing yards ranked second behind Bob Griese of Purdue.

Schedule

Season summary

Preseason
After winning a Big Ten Conference championship in 1964, culminating with a victory over Oregon State in the 1965 Rose Bowl, Michigan compiled a disappointing 4–6 record and tied for seventh place in the Big Ten during the 1965 season.

Starters returning on offense from the 1965 team included halfback Carl Ward, end Jack Clancy, and fullback Dave Fisher. Quarterback Dick Vidmer, who started three games in 1965, returned as the team's starting quarterback in 1966. Jim Detwiler, who missed most of the 1965 season and underwent ACL surgery on his knee, returned to the 1966 squad and became the Big Ten's leading scorer.  A key player who did not return from the 1965 offense was offensive tackle Tom Mack who was chosen by the Los Angeles Rams with the second overall pick in the 1966 NFL Draft.

On defense, Rich Volk and Mike Bass returned at the cornerback positions, and Frank Nunley returned at linebacker.  Key players who did not return from the 1965 squad included All-American defensive tackle Bill Yearby and linebacker Tom Cecchini who became a member of Michigan's coaching staff.

The coaching staff also underwent changes in 1966. In February, Michigan added Don James (inducted into the College Football Hall of Fame in 1997) and George Mans to replace defensive assistants Bob Hollway and Don Dufek Sr. Y. C. McNease was also added as ends and linebackers coach in April, replacing Jack Nelson. William A. Dodd, who played fullback and halfback for Michigan in 1962 and 1963, was hired in June as the freshman football coach, freeing up Dennis Fitzgerald to join the varsity coaching staff.

Michigan's 1966 recruiting class included two players who were later inducted into the College Football Hall of Fame: quarterback (later converted to safety) Tom Curtis and end Jim Mandich. Other members of the 1966 recruiting class were end Phil Seymour, halfback Garvie Craw, linebacker Cecil Pryor, tight end Mike Hankwitz, and quarterback Barry Pierson.

Oregon State

On September 17, 1966, Michigan opened its season with a 41–0 victory over Oregon State before a crowd of 56,097 at Michigan Stadium. Jack Clancy set a Michigan record with 10 receptions for 197 yards. Dick Vidmer completed 12 of 18 passes for 258 yards. Michigan tallied 502 yards of offense in the game. The defense held Oregon State to 193 yards of total offense.

California

On September 24, 1966, Michigan defeated California before a crowd of 40,000 at Memorial Stadium in Berkeley, California. Carl Ward and Dave Fisher scored Michigan's touchdowns, and Rick Sygar kicked a field goal and two extra points. Fisher had 90 rushing yards on 19 carries. Jack Clancy caught eight passes for 93 yards.

North Carolina

On October 1, 1966, Michigan (ranked No. 8 in the AP Poll) lost to North Carolina, 21–7, before a crowd of 88,233 at Michigan Stadium. Michigan took a 7–0 lead on a touchdown run by Dave Fisher in the first quarter. Two interceptions thrown by Dick Vidmer and two fumbles by Carl Ward allowed North Carolina back into the game. The Detroit Free Press wrote: "The Wolverines fumbled, bumbled, stumbled, and tumbled out of the ranks of unbeaten college football teams."

Michigan State

On October 8, 1966, Michigan lost to Michigan State, 20–7, before a crowd of 78,833 at Spartan Stadium in East Lansing, Michigan. Michigan State came into the game ranked No. 1 and favored by 14 points and led, 7–0, as the fourth quarter began. Michigan was held to 47 rushing yards.  Michigan quarterback Dick Vidmer threw a school record 47 passes, completing 18 for 168 yards, including a 15-yard touchdown pass to Jim Detwiler in the fourth quarter. Michigan's offense was hampered by the strong rushing of Spartan defender Bubba Smith.

Purdue

On October 15, 1966, Michigan lost to Purdue, 22–21, before a crowd of 79,642 at Michigan Stadium. A safety, a blocked punt, and two lost fumbles contributed to Michigan's third consecutive loss. Michigan led, 21–14, when Rick Sygar fielded a punt at the goal line and was tackled for a safety. Purdue next blocked a Michigan punt from the Michigan eight-yard line and recovered the loose ball for a touchdown. Dick Vidmer completed 13 of 18 passes for 208 yards, while the Michigan defense held Bob Griese to 63 yards and intercepted two of his passes. Michigan's Dave Fisher rushed for 120 yards on 20 carries.

Minnesota

On October 22, 1966, Michigan defeated Minnesota, 49–0, before a homecoming crowd of 71,749 at Michigan Stadium. The margin of victory was the largest in the history of the Little Brown Jug rivalry to that point. The victory broke a three-game losing streak for the Wolverines. Jack Clancy caught 10 passes for 168 yards and two touchdowns. Jim Detwiler had 16 carries for 60 yards and two touchdowns. Dick Vidmer completed 15 of 19 passes for 212 yards. Rick Sygar returned a punt 57 yards for a touchdown and kicked seven extra points.

Wisconsin

On October 29, 1966, Michigan defeated Wisconsin, 28–17, before a crowd of 52,881 at Camp Randall Stadium in Madison, Wisconsin. Michigan's fullback Dave Fisher was the leading rusher in the Big Ten Conference prior to the game and totaled 99 yards and scored a touchdown in the first half, but he suffered a shoulder injury in the second quarter. Jim Detwiler added two touchdowns for Michigan, and Carl Ward also scored a touchdown. Michigan totaled 232 rushing yards and 71 passing yards, while Wisconsin totaled 127 rushing yards and 185 passing yards.

Illinois

On November 5, 1966, Michigan lost to Illinois, 28–21, before a crowd of 59,322 in a snow storm at Michigan Stadium.  The outcome was the only Illinois victory in the seven-year rivalry between head coaching brothers Bump Elliott and Pete Elliott. Michigan led, 21–14, at the start of the fourth quarter. Illinois narrowed Michigan's lead on a 60-yard punt return for touchdown by Mick Smith. The extra point was missed, and Michigan led, 21–20. Later in the fourth quarter, Michigan had the ball at Illinois' six-yard line and appeared to be driving for a clinching touchdown. Illinois safety Bruce Sullivan intercepted Dick Vidmer's pass at the two-yard line and returned the ball 98 yards for a touchdown. Illinois successfully passed for a two-point conversion.

Northwestern

On November 12, 1966, Michigan defeated Northwestern, 28–20, before a crowd of 58,556 at Michigan Stadium. Dick Vidmer passed for 170 yards, including touchdown passes of 49 yards to Jim Detwiler and 33 yards to Jack Clancy. Vidmer also scored on a one-yard run, and Carl Ward also scored on a five-yard run. The Detroit Free Press wrote: "There were so many fundamental mistakes, it looked like romper room football. The same mistakes that have plagued Michigan all season threatened an upset in this home finale. Fumbles, dropped passes, missed tackles, bad passes from center on punts and botched-up punt returns."

Ohio State

    
    
    
    

On November 19, 1966, Michigan defeated Ohio State, 17–3, before a crowd of 83,403 at Ohio Stadium in Columbus, Ohio. Michigan totaled 382 yards of offense, including 272 rushing yards. Jim Detwiler rushed for 140 yards on 20 carries, including a seven-yard touchdown run in the second quarter. Michigan also scored on a 28-yard touchdown pass from Dick Vidmer to Clayton Wilhite in the third quarter. Vidmer passed for 110 yards to give him Michigan's career and season passing records. Jack Clancy had three receptions for 59 yards to conclude the season with a Big Ten record 1,079 receiving yards. Bo Rein had 82 rushing yards and 59 receiving yards for Ohio State. The loss gave Woody Hayes his second losing record in 16 seasons at Ohio State.

Postseason
With a 4–3 conference record (6–4 overall), Michigan tied with Illinois for third place in the Big Ten Conference. Michigan outscored all opponents by a combined total of 236 to 138. Undefeated Michigan State won the conference championship and was ranked No. 2 in the final AP Poll.

At Michigan's annual football bust held on November 21, 1966, center Joe Dayton was selected to serve as the captain of the 1967 Michigan Wolverines football team.

Michigan end Jack Clancy set new Big Ten records with 76 receptions and 1,077 receiving yards. He won numerous postseason awards, including the following:
 He was a consensus All-American, receiving first-team honors from the Associated Press, United Press International, American Football Coaches Association, Football Writers Association of America, Newspaper Enterprise Association, Central Press Association, Football News, Time, The Sporting News, and Walter Camp Football Foundation. 
 He was selected by both the Associated Press (AP, writers) and United Press International (UPI, coaches) as a first-team end on the 1966 All-Big Ten Conference football team.
 He was selected as the most valuable player on the 1966 Michigan team.
 Clancy finished third behind Bob Griese and George Webster in voting for the Chicago Tribune Silver Football as the Big Ten's most valuable player.

Defensive back Rick Volk also received multiple postseason awards, including first-team All-American honors from Time and The Sporting News, and first-team All-Big Ten honors from the AP and UPI.

Other Michigan players receiving All-Big Ten honors in 1966 were: Jim Detwiler (AP-1, UPI-1); Frank Nunley (AP-1, UPI-1); Dave Fisher (AP-2, UPI-1); Don Bailey (UPI-1); Carl Ward (AP-2, UPI-2); Henry Hanna (AP-2); James Hribal (AP-2); and John Rowser (UPI-2).

Six Michigan players were selected to play in postseason all-star games: Jack Clancy, Rick Volk, and Dave Fisher in the East–West Shrine Game; Carl Ward and Don Bailey in the North–South Shrine Game; and Frank Nunley in the Senior Bowl and Blue–Gray Football Classic.

Team awards were presented as follows:
Most Valuable Player: Jack Clancy
Meyer Morton Award: Don Bailey
John Maulbetsch Award: Tom Stincic
Arthur Robinsion Scholarship Award: Clayton Wilhite

Personnel

Letter winners
The following players received varsity letters for their participation on the 1966 football team.

Offense
 Donald Bailey, 6'0", 225 pounds, senior, Greensburg, Pennsylvania - started 6 games at right guard
 Mike Bass, 6'0", 180 pounds, senior, Ypsilanti, Michigan - started 4 games at right halfback, 2 games at left halfback
 John Buzynski 6'4", 230 pounds, senior, Harper Woods, Michigan - center 
 Jack Clancy, 6'1", 192 pounds, senior, Detroit Michigan - started 6 games at right end
 Jerome Danhof, 6'3", 228 pounds, senior, Detroit, Michigan - center 
 Joseph Dayton, 6'2", 229 pounds, junior, Detroit, Michigan - started 8 games at center
 Paul D'Eramo, 5'10", 208 pounds, junior, Youngstown, Ohio - started 1 game at left guard
 Jim Detwiler, 6'3", 215 pounds, senior, Toledo, Ohio - started 1 game at left halfback
 Dave Fisher, 5'10", 210 pounds, senior, Kettering, Ohio - started 7 games at fullback
 Henry Hanna, 6'0", 220 pounds, senior, Youngstown, Ohio - started 7 games at left guard
 William Hardy, 6'1", 229 pounds, senior, Detroit - started 1 game at left offensive tackle, 1 game at right guard, 3 games at right defensive tackle
 James Hribal, 6'0", 220 pounds, senior, Dearborn, Michigan - started 5 games at right tackle
 Derrick Humphries, 6'2", 190 pounds, junior, Detroit - end 
 Ron Johnson, 6'1", 192 pounds, sophomore, Detroit - halfback
 Stanley Kemp, 6'1", 185 pounds, senior, Greenville, Michigan - end 
 Jon Kramer 6'3", 213 pounds, sophomore, Toledo, Ohio - started 4 games at left offensive end, 1 game at right offensive end
 Thomas Landsittel, 5'10", 198 pounds, senior, Delaware, Ohio - offensive guard
 Peter Mair, 6'4", 233 pounds, senior, Allentown, Pennsylvania - offensive tackle
 Jerry Miklos, 6'3", 225 pounds, sophomore, Chicago - started 1 game at center, 1 game at left tackle, 1 game at right tackle
 Ray Phillips, 6'3", 228 pounds, junior, Evanston, Illinois - started 5 games at left tackle
 John Reynolds, 5'10", 218 pounds, sophomore, Grosse Pointe Woods, Michigan - fullback 
 Ernie Sharpe, 5'11", 191 pounds, junior, Palos Heights, Illinois - started 5 games at left halfback
 Warren Sipp, 6'1", 216 pounds, sophomore, Akron, Ohio - started 3 games at left end
 Dick Vidmer, 6'1", 185 pounds, junior, Greensburg, Pennsylvania - started 9 games at quarterback
 Carl Ward, 5'11", 178 pounds, senior, Cincinnati - started 3 games at right halfback
 Clayton Wilhite, 6'4", 210 pounds, senior, Bay City, Michigan - started 1 game at left end
 Ken Wright, 6'1", 230 pounds, senior, Bay City, Michigan - started 1 game at left tackle

Defense
 Mike Bass, 6'0", 180 pounds, senior, Ypsilanti, Michigan - started 10 games at cornerback
 Charles Barry Dehlin, 5'11", 205 pounds, senior, Flushing, Michigan - started 3 games at linebacker, 1 game at left offensive guard
 Tom Goss, 6'2", 225 pounds, junior, Knoxville, Tennessee - started 3 games at middle guard
 Gerald Hartman, 6'1", 168 pounds, sophomore, Ann Arbor, Michigan - defensive back
 Jon Kramer, 6'3", 213 pounds, sophomore, Toledo, Ohio - started 6 games at left defensive end
 Louis Lee, 6'2", 195 pounds, senior, Willow Grove, Pennsylvania - defensive back
 Bob Mielke, 6'1", 223 pounds, senior, Chicago - started 7 games at middle guard, 3 games at left defensive tackle, 1 game at left offensive guard, 1 game at left offensive tackle
 Dennis Morgan, 5'11", 230 pounds, junior, Phoenixville, Pennsylvania - started 7 games at linebacker
 Frank Nunley, 6'2", 218 pounds, senior, Belleville, Michigan - started 10 games at linebacker, 2 games at right offensive guard, 1 game at right offensive tackle
 Dave Porter, 6'3", 237 pounds, junior, Lansing, Michigan - started 7 games at right defensive tackle, 3 games at right offensive tackle, 1 game at center
 Rocky Rosema, 6'2", 214 pounds, junior, Grand Rapids, Michigan - started 4 games at left defensive end
 John Rowser, 6'O", 183 pounds, senior, Detroit - started 10 games at cornerback, 3 games at left halfback
 Tom Stincic, 6'3", 217 pounds, sophomore, Cleveland - started 10 games at right defensive end, 3 games at right offensive end, 1 game at right offensive guard
 Dick Sygar, 5'11", 185 pounds, senior, Niles, Ohio - started 10 games at safety, 2 games at right halfback, 1 game at fullback
 Rick Volk, 6'3", 192 pounds, senior, Wauseon, Ohio - started 10 games at safety, 2 games at fullback, 1 game at quarterback
 Robert Wedge, 6'2", 193 pounds, sophomore, Port Huron, Michigan - defensive back
 Dick Williamson, 6'4", 225 pounds, junior, East Detroit, Michigan - started 7 games at left defensive tackle, 1 game at left offensive tackle

Coaching staff
Michigan's 1966 coaching, training, and support staff included the following persons.
Head coach: Bump Elliott
Assistant coaches: William Dodd (freshman), Dennis Fitzgerald, Henry Fonde (backfield), Don James (defensive backfield), George Mans, Tony Mason (offensive line), Y. C. McNease (defensive line)
Trainer: Jim Hunt
Manager: David Muir

Statistical leaders
Michigan's individual statistical leaders for the 1966 season include those listed below.

Rushing

Passing

Receiving

Kickoff returns

Punt returns

References

Michigan
Michigan Wolverines football seasons
Michigan Wolverines football